Le Cateau-Cambrésis (before 1977: Le Cateau) is a commune in the Nord department in northern France. The term Cambrésis indicates that it lies in the county of that name which fell to the Prince-Bishop of Cambrai. Le Cateau station has rail connections to Paris, Maubeuge and Saint-Quentin.

History
The Peace of Cateau-Cambrésis, ending the Italian Wars, was agreed there on 2–3 April 1559.
 Until 1678, the city belonged to the Spanish Netherlands (now called Belgium). France conquered the city officially by the treaty of Nijmegen signed in 1678.
On 28 March 1794, allied forces under the prince of Coburg, defeated French forces at Le Cateau.
Le Cateau formed the right wing of the front of II Corps of the British Expeditionary Force at the Battle of Le Cateau on 26 August 1914, during its withdrawal from the Battle of Mons.

Heraldry

Population

Matisse Museum
The Musée Départemental Henri Matisse installed in the Palais Fénelon in the center of Le Cateau boasts the third largest collection of Matisse works in France.

Notable people
Births:
Henri Matisse, artist
Marshal Mortier
Pierre Nord
Raymond Poïvet, one of the creators of the French science fiction comics Les Pionniers de l'Espérance

Pierre Mauroy was a high school student in Le Cateau, and later its representative at the general council for the Nord department.

Gallery

See also
Communes of the Nord department

References

External links

 Webpage (in French)
 Aujourd'hui au Cateau-Cambrésis (in French)
 Webpage about Le Cateau-Cambrésis (in French)
 Tourist Office (in English)
 Beffroivision, local TV channel
 Photographs from the Highland Cemetery in Le Cateau-Cambrésis

Cateaucambresis